NOAA Ship Rainier (S 221) is a survey vessel in commission with the National Oceanic and Atmospheric Administration (NOAA). Her primary mission is to chart all aspects of the ocean and sea floor, primarily in Alaska and the Pacific Northwest.  The ship is home-ported at the NOAA Marine Operations Center - Pacific in Newport, Oregon.

Construction and characteristics
Rainier was designed as a "medium survey ship" (MSS) by the U.S. Maritime Administration.  She was built for the U.S. Coast and Geodetic Survey at the Aerojet-General Shipyards in Jacksonville, Florida. She was launched on 15 March 1967 along with her sister ship Fairweather.  The principal speaker at the ceremony was Dr. J. Herbert Hollomon, acting Under Secretary of Commerce.   The ship was christened by Mrs. Robert M. White, wife of the administrator of the Environmental Science Services Administration.  The ship's original cost was reported to be $4 million.

Rainier was delivered to the Coast and Geodetic Survey in April 1968, and commissioned on 2 October 1968 as USC&GS Rainier (MSS 21) in a joint ceremony with her sister ship USC&GS Fairweather at the Pacific Marine Center in Seattle, Washington.  The principal speaker at the ceremony was Senator Warren G. Magnuson.  When NOAA was formed on 3 October 1970 and took over the Coast and Geodetic Surveys assets, she became a part of the NOAA fleet as NOAAS Rainier (S 221).

Rainiers hull is constructed of welded steel plates. Her registered tonnage is 1,591 gross and 578 net. Her construction complies with the standards of the American Bureau of Shipping.

Rainier can cruise at 12 knots. These are driven by two diesel engines. The two main propulsion engines are General Motors EMD LR-12-567-C, each of which produces 1,200 shaft horsepower. Electric power on board is provided by two diesel generators, each of which is capable of producing 300 kW. The generators are powered by MTU/Detroit Diesel 12V2000P82 engines. She also has a 75 kW emergency generator. The ship has a 200 horsepower bow thruster for improved maneuverability.

The ship's tanks hold  for diesel fuel, giving Rainier an unrefueled range of 5,898 nautical miles.

Rainier has 14 single-person staterooms, 13 double staterooms, and 6 four-person bunk rooms, giving her a total berthing capacity of 64. The ship is equipped with an officers' wardroom, officer's mess, technician's mess, crew mess, galley, gym, laundry facilities, and an infirmary.

The deck equipment features a large crane aft and two bow-mounted fixed cranes. She originally had an A-frame aft, but it was removed during a major refit in 2010 in favor of a Rolls-Royce Group ODIM Brooke Ocean MVP200 Moving Vessel Profiler for underway sound velocity determination during mapping missions.

She carries a Kongsberg EM710 multibeam sonar, and a variety of other conductivity, temperature, and water and bottom sampling instruments to map and characterize the ocean.

The ship carries four survey launches for shallow water work. They were built by All American Marine at its Bellingham, Washington shipyard. They are constructed of welded aluminum. They can cruise at 24 knots driven by a single propeller powered by a Cummins QSC 8.3 liter 490-hp Diesel engine. Each of these survey launches is equipped with a Kongsberg EM2040 multibeam sonar for mapping purposes. Rainier also carries four other smaller boats to support dive operations and shore operations.

Rainier's crew varies with her mission, but her maximum complement is 13 NOAA Corps commissioned officers/mates, 4 US Coast Guard licensed engineers, 6 unlicensed engineers, 16 deckhands, 10 survey crew, 4 stewards, 1 electronics technician, and 1 maintenance person, plus up to 8 scientists.

The ship is named for Mount Rainier in Washington State.

Operational history 
Rainier's career began somewhat inauspiciously.  While she was delivered to USC&GS in April 1968, she was not placed into commission until October because Congress had failed to appropriate funds to operate the ship.  Since that time, however, she has been at sea almost every year.  The table below, while incomplete, gives a sense of her work.

Significant incidents 
The fishing vessel Cricket sank in southern Sitka Sound on 10 June 2008.  Her two crewmen abandoned ship in survival suits. Rainier rescued them.

The ship underwent a service-life extension renovation during 2010.  This work took place at the Vigor Marine shipyard in Portland, Oregon, under a $13.1 million contract.  Among the work performed was the installation of the Kongsburg multibeam sonar system and the MVP200 Moving Vessel Profiler, replacement of davits and other deck machinery, refitting of living and berthing spaces, and upgrades to machinery control systems, power generation machinery, and the ship’s steering system.  Rainier was originally expected to be retired in 2015, but with the additional investment in extending her life, she is now expected to serve until 2028, when she will be 60 years old.

While transiting the Montlake Cut in the Lake Washington Ship Canal in Seattle, Washington, on 16 April 2018, Rainier struck the bottom and a concrete wall. No injuries were reported, but the ship suffered damage to one of her propellers, dents in her hull, and paint scrapes.

During the summer surveying season in 2018, while off the Southern California coast, the US Coast Guard requested that she assist a disabled sailboat.  Rainier successfully towed the boat to calm waters.

On March 22, 2018, NOAA hosted a ceremony in Newport, Oregon to celebrate the Rainier's and her sister ships Fairweather's 50 years of service.

NOAA sponsors a Teacher at Sea program in its fleet, where primary and secondary school teachers go aboard to participate in the science undertaken by the ships.  The intent of the program is to spread awareness of NOAA and ocean sciences generally to teachers who can use this knowledge in their classrooms.  Rainier has had a Teacher at Sea participant aboard in 2011, 2013, 2014, 2016, 2018, and 2019.

In 1977 Rainier earned the NOAA Unit Citation.

Notes

 

Ships of the National Oceanic and Atmospheric Administration
Survey ships of the United States
Ships built in Jacksonville, Florida
1967 ships
Washington (state)-related ships
Maritime incidents in 2018